Karl III is a Norwegian sitcom that aired on TV 2 in 2009. It is a sequel to Mot i brøstet and Karl & Co. Upon its release it was heavily criticized by both critics and viewers for departing from the series' original style. It was cancelled after one season.

Cast
Regulars:
Nils Vogt as Karl Reverud
Bjørn Sundquist as Roy Butler
Nina Woxholtt as Agnes Marie Stangfeldt
Håvard Bakke as  Børre Tryvann-Larssen

Plot
The plot revolves around Karl Reverud, now a wealthy man, who has moved to Aker Brygge with his wife Agnes Marie and his butler Roy.

Production
Shooting of Karl III started in 2008, and a total of 12 episodes was ordered for the first season. The first episode premiered on TV 2 on 23 February 2009. Unlike Mot i brøstet and Karl & Co, Karl III was filmed without a live audience. The show was cancelled after its first season due to low ratings and negative reviews from both media and viewers.

Reception
The show was met with universally negative reviews, getting an average of 2 out of six stars. It was also slaughtered by the viewers in polls. Ultimately, along with low ratings, this led to the series' cancellation.

References

External links
 

Norwegian television sitcoms
Television spin-offs
2009 Norwegian television series debuts
2009 Norwegian television series endings
TV 2 (Norway) original programming